Paracymoriza okinawanus is a moth in the family Crambidae. It was described by Yutaka Yoshiyasu and Yutaka Arita in 1992. It is found in Okinawa, Japan.

References

Acentropinae
Moths described in 1992